The 1994 Federation Cup was the 32nd edition of the most important competition between national teams in women's tennis. Spain defeated the United States in the final, giving Spain their 3rd and 2nd consecutive title.

This was the last competition to bear the name "Federation Cup", and the last in which the final group of teams assembled to compete at a single site. The following year, the International Tennis Federation rechristened the competition the Fed Cup, and  adopted a Davis Cup-style format in which all ties were held in one of the competing countries.

Qualifying rounds
 Nations in bold qualified for the World Group.

Americas Zone

Venue: Cochabamba Tennis Centre, Cochabamba, Bolivia (outdoor clay)

Dates: April 11–17

Participating Teams

Asia/Oceania Zone

Venue: Delhi LTA Complex, New Delhi, India (outdoor clay)

Dates: May 2–6

Participating Teams

Europe/Africa Zone

Venue: Freizeit Park, Bad Waltersdorf, Austria (outdoor clay)

Dates: April 18–23

Participating Teams

World Group

Venue: Waldstadion T.C., Frankfurt, Germany (outdoor clay)

Dates: July 18–24

Draw

External links 
 1994 Fed Cup 

 
Billie Jean King Cups by year
Federation
1994 in women's tennis